Agron Musaraj was the minister of the interior for Albania in the 1992 government of Sali Berisha. He is a member of the Democratic Party.

References

Living people
Year of birth missing (living people)
Democratic Party of Albania politicians
Government ministers of Albania
Interior ministers of Albania
Place of birth missing (living people)
21st-century Albanian politicians